Raised Fist is a Swedish hardcore punk band formed in 1993 in Luleå. It currently consists of guitarists Jimmy Tikkanen and Daniel Holmgren, bassist Andreas Johansson, vocalist Alexander Hagman and drummer Robert Wiiand.

History
Raised Fist was formed in 1993 in the Swedish city Luleå, with Alexander Hagman as the lead singer. The name "Raised Fist" refers to the Rage Against the Machine song "Know Your Enemy", which include the lyrics: "Born with an insight and a raised fist..."

The band played at the  Scandinavian Roskilde Festival in 2004. At one time they were signed to Burning Heart Records, which houses a number of Swedish punk rock and hardcore punk bands.

In 2010 Hagman received a serious electrical shock during a concert in Sundsvall when he touched a power cable which had been punctured by a riot fence. He collapsed on the stage.

The band's album Veil of Ignorance, released in 2009, placed on the Swedish charts and was nominated for a Swedish Grammy Award.  Many of the songs on this album were written by Hagman.

In 2013 Raised Fist signed a two-album contract with Epitaph Records. In 2015, after working on the songs for five years, Raised Fist released an album From the North.

Appearances
Vocalist Alexander appeared in an interview on Swedish television TV4 where he criticizes the EU Directive on the enforcement of intellectual property rights in EU countries.

Members

Current
 Alexander "Alle" Hagman – vocals (1993–present)
 Jimmy Tikkanen – guitar (2011–present)
 Daniel Holmgren – guitar (2002–present)
 Andreas "Josse" Johansson – bass (1993–present)
 Robert Wiiand – drums (2017–present)

Former
 Petri "Pecka" Rönnberg – guitars (1993–1996)
 "Peson" – guitars (1993–1996), († died 2002)
 Marco Eronen – guitars (1996–2011)
 Peter "Pita" Karlsson – drums (1993–1996)
 Oskar Karlsson – drums (1996–2005), († died 2016)
 Matte Modin – drums (2005–2017)

Timeline

Discography

Studio albums

EP
 You're Not Like Me (1994)
 Stronger Than Ever (1996)

Compilations
 Heartattack Vol. 1: Burning Heart Compilation (Disc 2)
 Watch Your Step (2001)
  Punk-o-Rama 6, 8 
  Cheap Shots 1,2,3,4 
 Hardcore for Syria

References

External links
 Raised Fist official website
 MySpace – Raised Fist
 burningheart.com
 Raised Fist Interview 2009

Swedish hardcore punk groups
Epitaph Records artists
Burning Heart Records artists
1993 establishments in Sweden